In Greek mythology, Ceteus (Ancient Greek: Κητεύς Kêteus means "of the ravines" from kêtôeis) may refer to the following two characters:

 Ceteus, an Arcadian prince as one of the 50 sons of the impious King Lycaon either by the naiad Cyllene, Nonacris or by unknown woman. In one version of the myth, he was called the son of Parthaon (son of Dorieus) and brother of Paros. Ceteus was said to be the father of Callisto or Megisto, both were called the mother of Arcas. In one account, Callisto's mother was called Stilbe. Ceteus was called the Kneeler among the stars. These events have taken place on the Arcadian mountain of Nonacris.
 Ceteus, one of the commanders of the Lamian Centaurs who joined Dionysus in his campaign against India.

Notes

References 

 Apollodorus, The Library with an English Translation by Sir James George Frazer, F.B.A., F.R.S. in 2 Volumes, Cambridge, MA, Harvard University Press; London, William Heinemann Ltd. 1921. . Online version at the Perseus Digital Library. Greek text available from the same website.
Fowler, Robert L., Early Greek Mythography. Volume 2: Commentary. Oxford University Press. Great Clarendon Street, Oxford, OX2 6DP, United Kingdom. 2013. 
Gaius Julius Hyginus, Astronomica from The Myths of Hyginus translated and edited by Mary Grant. University of Kansas Publications in Humanistic Studies. Online version at the Topos Text Project.
Nonnus of Panopolis, Dionysiaca translated by William Henry Denham Rouse (1863-1950), from the Loeb Classical Library, Cambridge, MA, Harvard University Press, 1940.  Online version at the Topos Text Project.
Nonnus of Panopolis, Dionysiaca. 3 Vols. W.H.D. Rouse. Cambridge, MA., Harvard University Press; London, William Heinemann, Ltd. 1940–1942. Greek text available at the Perseus Digital Library

Sons of Lycaon
Princes in Greek mythology
Arcadian characters in Greek mythology
Arcadian mythology